Revelation Online is a free-to-play massively multiplayer online role-playing game (MMORPG) developed by NetEase, under the title Revelation in China and Revelation Online in the rest of the world. It is published by My.com in Europe and North America, and received an open release worldwide on March 6, 2017. The game features classic MMORPG gameplay and is set in a world inspired by the books of the Chinese fantasy author Jiang Nan. Revelation Online receives regular update content updates, with the latest, Heaven and Earth, due for release in 2019.

Gameplay 

Revelation Online is set in the fantasy world of Nuanor, with its world, characters, and concepts being influenced by Chinese mythology and folklore, and based on stories written by the popular Chinese fantasy author Jiang Nan.

Revelation Online is set in an open world, and features over 100 hours of story content, raids and dungeons. Players can use the power of flight to explore and travel, with aerial combat available once players reach a certain level. Several classes are available, including the Assassin, Gunslinger, Spiritshaper, Vanguard, and Swordmage. Players can participate in PvP battles, guild battles, and team up to complete quests or enter into relationships.

The content update Heaven and Earth, due for release in 2019, will add new story content, the ability to marry other players, Battle Companions (animals which act as pets and companions to the player character), and a challenging temple featuring twelve bosses based on the Chinese Zodiac signs.

Development and release 
Revelation Online was developed by China-based developer NetEase, who partnered with Blizzard Entertainment on Chinese versions of games such as World of Warcraft, Hearthstone, Diablo III, Warcraft III and StarCraft II. Development started in 2005 and Revelation Online was released for its open beta stage in China in June 2015.

On June 6, 2016, My.com announced it would publish the game in Europe and North America. Mail.Ru, the parent company of My.com, was confirmed as Revelation Onlines publisher in Russia. The game was released in a closed beta state in 2016., with the worldwide open release following on March 6, 2017.

Business model 
Revelation Online is free-to-play but allows players to pay for certain in-game content, including cosmetics.

Reception 
MMORPG.com said that the Revelation Online beta had "the makings of a great game" and praised the noticeable improvements from regular maintenance and patches. MMOs.com said the game "overcomes its issues by excelling in its strengths: combat and multiple avenues of progression." MMO GAMES praised Revelation Onlines "beautiful graphics and decent storytelling", and added that allowing players to fly sets it apart from other games.

References

External links 

 Official Revelation Online website (English)
 Official Revelation website (Chinese)

Active massively multiplayer online games
Massively multiplayer online role-playing games
2015 video games
NetEase games
Video games developed in China
Windows games
Windows-only games
Free-to-play video games